Skrzydlów  is a village in the administrative district of Gmina Kłomnice, within Częstochowa County, Silesian Voivodeship, in southern Poland.

The village has a population of 844.

See also
 Manor house in Skrzydlów

References

Villages in Częstochowa County